The 1923 Saint Mary's Saints football team was an American football team that represented Saint Mary's College of California during the 1923 college football season.  In their third season under head coach Slip Madigan, the Gaels compiled a 5–3–1 record and outscored their opponents by a combined total of 212 to 111. The Gaels' victories included a 22–20 besting of Arizona.  Their losses included a 49–0 defeat against undefeated national champion California.

Schedule

References

Saint Mary's
Saint Mary's Gaels football seasons
Saint Mary's Saints football